was a Japanese singer and actress, active in the mid-1980s. After winning a nationwide television show at age 15 in 1983, she debuted as an idol in 1984. Her death by suicide two years later led to a number of copycat suicides, a phenomenon that would bear her name.

Early life 
Yukiko Okada was born as Satō Kayo  (佐藤佳代) on August 22, 1967, the second daughter of the Satō family. The family later moved to Nagoya. In elementary school, Okada loved to read, especially manga, and she was a talented artist. In junior high school, Okada wanted to become a singer and applied for every possible audition, anything from major productions to the smallest talent recruitment, hoping to become a star. She was rejected every time until she was finally accepted to a TV talent program, Star Tanjō! on Nippon Television – similar to Star Search, though the final stage was her singing to get interest from talent agents – singing Kitahara Sawako's "MY BOYFRIEND" for the audition, and Akina Nakamori's "Slow Motion" for the final round, which she won in March 1983.

Career 
Okada made her debut in 1984, when on April that year, she released her first single, "First Date", written by composer and singer Mariya Takeuchi. She was nicknamed "Yukko" (ユッコ) by her fans, which is a common abbreviation for the name "Yukiko" in the Japanese language. Her smile bore the same name: the "Yukko smile".

Okada won Rookie of the Year in the year of her debut,. and she was awarded the 26th Japan Record Awards Grand Prix Best New Artist Award for her third single, "-Dreaming Girl- Koi, Hajimemashite", also written by Takeuchi.

Okada played the leading role in her first television drama Kinjirareta Mariko (The Forbidden Mariko), in 1985. Her 1986 single , written by Seiko Matsuda and composed by Ryuichi Sakamoto,  reached number one on the Oricon weekly singles chart dated February 10, 1986. (It was later covered by idol girl group Sunmyu as its debut song in 2013.)

Death 

On April 8, 1986, Okada was found with a slashed wrist in her gas-filled Tokyo apartment, crouching in a closet and crying. She was discovered by a rescue team called in by the apartment's manager after other residents noticed the smell of gas. Okada's manager eventually arrived and took her to nearby , where her injuries were treated.

In a 2016 article on the Asahi Weekly, Sun Music former managing director Tokio Fukuda recalled that Sun Music founder Hideyoshi Aizawa called him to pick up Okada from the hospital. When he met her, she was crying softly. He then asked her where she wanted to go: to her parents' home in Nagoya, her apartment, or the office. She replied that the office was good, so she was brought to the sixth floor of the Sun Music building. Aizawa then called Fukuda, leading him to step out.

While Fukuda, the management director and the staff were discussing how to avoid a media scandal, Okada ran to the stairs, went to the roof of the seven story building, took off her shoes, and jumped, resulting in instant death. It was 12:15 PM JST.

The reason for the suicide is still unknown. Okada was reported to have been "[u]pset and depressed about an unhappy love affair", with an actor described to be "old enough to be her father", Tōru Minegishi, a co-star in Kinjirareta Mariko. Minegishi said that "he thought of her more as a younger sister". When asked if a relationship with an actor (who the article cited did not name) was the cause, Fukuda replied that he did not know.

Okada's remains were cremated, and were interred at the Jōman-ji Temple, Aisai, Aichi Prefecture, Japan.

Legacy 

Her fans were shocked and shattered by her untimely death. It resulted in many copycat suicides in Japan, soon christened with the neologism "Yukiko Syndrome" or "Yukko Syndrome." By April 26, 1986, 23 out of 36 youth suicides since Okada died were committed by also jumping off a building.

In turn, it has been suggested that Okada may have had in mind idol Yasuko Endō, who also committed suicide by falling from a rooftop ten days earlier.

A ninth single, scheduled for release on April 14, 1986, was postponed on fears of more suicides. The single, "花のイマージュ" (Hana no Image), was eventually released on March 1999 included in "Memorial Album".

Mariya Takeuchi covered three of the songs she wrote for Okada on her fortieth anniversary album Turntable. A compilation album of all eleven songs Takeuchi wrote for Okada, Yukiko Okada Mariya's Songbook, was released in 2019, and debuted at no. 13 on the Oricon Weekly Album Chart on October 28, 2019.

In the July 30, 2017 edition of the Chunichi Sport, it was mentioned that on July 29, 2017, a fan meeting was held at the 9th floor of the Tokai Radio Headquarters in Nagoya to celebrate what would have been the 50th birthday of Yukiko Okada in August 2017.  Entitled "Sing again! Yukko!", this was organized by 'Dotore Yamaguchi's Dokidoki Radio', '84/ Dr. Sato Yamaguchi in cooperation with Tokai Radio Magazine House, Pony Canyon, and Sun Music.  It was a time to remember the life of Yukiko Okada through pictures presentation and songs and displayed other memorabilia.

Discography

Singles 
"First Date" (1984) Glico's Cafe Jelly jingle
"Little Princess" (1984)
"Dreaming Girl-Koi, Hajimemashite" (1984) Glico's "Special Chocolate" jingle
"Futari Dake no Ceremony" (1985) Toshiba's "Let's Chat" jingle
"Summer Beach" (1985) Glico's Cafe Jelly jingle
"Kanashii Yokan" (1985)
"Love Fair" (1985) Glico's Cecil Chocolate jingle
"Kuchibiru Network" (1986) Kanebo's lipstick commercial
"Hana no Image" (1986) [released posthumously]
"Believe in You" (strings version 2002) [released posthumously]

Albums 
 (1984)
 (Compilation Album) (1984)
Fairy (1985)
 (1985)
 (Compilation Album) (1985)
 (1986)

Posthumous albums
Memorial Box (メモリアルBOX) (First compilation and box set to be released since her death. Includes her two Okurimino compilations, her final album "Venus Tanjou", and the previously unreleased single, "Hana no Image" coupled with "Himitsu no Symphony".) (1999)
 (Box set containing all her four albums plus non-album singles, DVD including promo videos, and other previously unreleased material.) (2002)
All Songs Request (Compilation with tracks selected by fans through a voting website.) (2002)
The Premium Best (ザ・プレミアムベスト) (Compilation album of her all her eight released singles and b-sides plus "Hana No Image" and the 2003 strings version of "Believe in You". Also includes an extra karaoke disc of all mentioned tracks.) (2012)
Golden☆Idol (ゴールデン☆アイドル) (Compilation album of all her eight released singles and b-sides plus her unreleased ninth single and b-sid.e) (2014)
Present (プレゼント) (Compilation album of non-album tracks except for b-sides of singles from previously existing albums. Released as part of her Hi-Res album reissue campaign.) (2015)
Yukiko Okada  Mariya's Songbook (posthumous compilation album of songs sung by Yukiko Okada written and composed by Mariya Takeuchi) (CD released October 16, 2019,  Analog LP released April 20, 2020)

Videos 
Yukiko in SWISS (1985) (Pony Canyon)
Memories of Switzerland (1985) (Pony Canyon)

DVD 
Memories in Switzerland (2002) (Pony Canyon) - A compilation of the above two videos on a single DVD.

References

External links 
 Yukiko Okada page on Pony Canyon
 Yukiko Okada on Myspace
 Yukiko Okada at Find a Grave

People from Nagoya
Japanese women pop singers
Japanese idols
Japanese television personalities
1967 births
Suicides by jumping in Japan
Suicides in Tokyo
Pony Canyon artists
People of Shōwa-period Japan
20th-century Japanese actresses
20th-century Japanese women singers
20th-century Japanese singers
Singing talent show winners
1986 deaths
1986 suicides
Female suicides
20th-century women pianists